Rickling is a municipality in the district of Segeberg, in Schleswig-Holstein, Germany. It is situated approximately 15 km southeast of Neumünster.

Rickling is part of the Amt ("collective municipality") Boostedt-Rickling.

References

Segeberg